Aethomys is a genus of rodent from Africa. They are commonly referred to as rock rats, bush rats or rock mice.

Species
Genus Aethomys
Aethomys bocagei – Bocage's rock rat (Thomas, 1904)
Aethomys chrysophilus – red rock rat (de Winton, 1897)
Aethomys granti – Grant's rock rat (Wroughton, 1908)
Aethomys hindei – Hinde's rock rat (Thomas, 1902)
Aethomys ineptus – Tete Veld aethomys (Thomas & Wroughton, 1908)
Aethomys kaiseri – Kaiser's rock rat (Noack, 1887)
Aethomys namaquensis – Namaqua rock rat (A. Smith, 1834)
Aethomys nyikae – Nyika rock rat (Thomas, 1897)
Aethomys silindensis – Silinda rock rat (Roberts, 1938)
Aethomys stannarius – Tinfield's rock rat (Thomas, 1913)
Aethomys thomasi – Thomas's rock rat (de Winton, 1897)

References

 
Rodent genera
Taxa named by Oldfield Thomas